Twiggs County is a county located in the central portion of the U.S. state of Georgia.  As of the 2020 census, the population was 8,022. The county seat is Jeffersonville. The county was created on December 14, 1809, and named for American Revolutionary War general John Twiggs.

Twiggs County is included in the Macon, GA Metropolitan Statistical Area.

The Twiggs County Courthouse is located in Jeffersonville.

Geography

Due to its location on the fall line, the county boasts a diverse geography. Northern parts of the county tend to be hillier, being part of the Piedmont region, and southern parts of the county tend to be flatter, being part of the upper Atlantic coastal plain.

The geographical center of Georgia lies in Twiggs County — off Bullard Road near Old Marion.

The southwestern and central portion of Twiggs County, south of Dry Branch and west of Jeffersonville, is located in the Lower Ocmulgee River sub-basin of the Altamaha River basin. A narrow northwestern portion of the county, from just north to southwest of Dry Branch, is located in the Upper Ocmulgee River sub-basin of the Altamaha River basin. The entire eastern edge of the county is located in the Lower Oconee River sub-basin of the same Altamaha River basin, with a small triangular portion of Twiggs County, south of Interstate 16 and west of Danville, located in the Little Ocmulgee River sub-basin of the same larger Altamaha River basin.

Major highways

  Interstate 16
  U.S. Route 23
  U.S. Route 80
  U.S. Route 129 Alternate
  State Route 18
  State Route 19
  State Route 57
  State Route 87
  State Route 96
  State Route 112
  State Route 358
  State Route 404 (unsigned designation for I-16)
  State Route 540 (Fall Line Freeway)

Adjacent counties
 Wilkinson County - northeast
 Laurens County - southeast
 Bleckley County - south
 Houston County - southwest
 Bibb County - west
 Jones County - northwest

National protected area
 Bond Swamp National Wildlife Refuge (part)

Demographics

2000 census
As of the census of 2000, there were 10,590 people, 3,832 households, and 2,862 families living in the county. There were 4,291 housing units at an average density of 12 per square mile (5/km2). The racial makeup of the county was 54.88% White, 43.65% Black or African American, 0.21% Native American, 0.11% Asian, 0.03% Pacific Islander, 0.25% from other races, and 0.87% from two or more races.  1.06% of the population were Hispanic or Latino of any race.

There were 3,832 households, out of which 33.40% had children under the age of 18 living with them, 52.00% were married couples living together, 17.50% had a female householder with no husband present, and 25.30% were non-families. 22.30% of all households were made up of individuals, and 8.70% had someone living alone who was 65 years of age or older.  The average household size was 2.73 and the average family size was 3.20.

In the county, the population was spread out, with 27.00% under the age of 18, 9.40% from 18 to 24, 29.00% from 25 to 44, 23.30% from 45 to 64, and 11.30% who were 65 years of age or older.  The median age was 35 years. For every 100 females, there were 91.80 males.  For every 100 females age 18 and over, there were 90.60 males.

The median income for a household in the county was $31,608, and the median income for a family was $38,715. Males had a median income of $31,141 versus $22,057 for females. The per capita income for the county was $14,259.  About 15.50% of families and 19.70% of the population were below the poverty line, including 25.20% of those under age 18 and 25.80% of those age 65 or over.

2010 census
As of the 2010 United States Census, there were 9,023 people, 3,634 households, and 2,492 families living in the county. The racial makeup of the county was 56.8% white, 41.3% black or African American, 0.3% American Indian, 0.2% Asian, 0.3% from other races, and 1.1% from two or more races. Those of Hispanic or Latino origin made up 1.4% of the population. In terms of ancestry, 11.1% were American, and 8.4% were English.

Of the 3,634 households, 28.8% had children under the age of 18 living with them, 46.4% were married couples living together, 16.5% had a female householder with no husband present, 31.4% were non-families, and 27.6% of all households were made up of individuals. The average household size was 2.46 and the average family size was 2.99. The median age was 45.0 years.

The median income for a household in the county was $26,521 and the median income for a family was $31,324. Males had a median income of $38,886 versus $25,446 for females. The per capita income for the county was $15,904. About 17.3% of families and 21.2% of the population were below the poverty line, including 27.6% of those under age 18 and 20.9% of those age 65 or over.

2020 census

As of the 2020 United States census, there were 8,022 people, 3,044 households, and 1,838 families residing in the county.

Education
 Twiggs Academy
 Twiggs County Comprehensive Middle/High School
 Jefersonville Elementary

Communities
 Allentown
 Danville
 Dry Branch
 Jeffersonville (county seat)

Notable people
 Philip Cook, Confederate general in the Civil War and postbellum U.S. Congressman.
 Darqueze Dennard, cornerback for the Cincinnati Bengals of the National Football League and former cornerback for the Michigan State Spartans football team. He was the winner of the 2013 Jim Thorpe Award.
 Dudley Mays Hughes, member of the U.S. House of Representatives, American politician, farmer and railroad executive.
 Chuck Leavell, an American musician and current tree farmer in Twiggs County, who was a member of The Allman Brothers Band during the height of their 1970s popularity, a founding member of the jazz-rock combo Sea Level, a frequently-employed session musician, and long-time touring member of The Rolling Stones.

Politics

See also

 National Register of Historic Places listings in Twiggs County, Georgia
List of counties in Georgia

References

 
Georgia (U.S. state) counties
1809 establishments in Georgia (U.S. state)
Populated places established in 1809
Macon metropolitan area, Georgia